The Federation of Environmental Trade Associations (FETA) is a UK body which represents the interests of manufacturers, suppliers, installers and contractors within the refrigeration, heating, ventilating, and air conditioning industry. It is based in Hare Hatch (in the parish of Wargrave) near Wokingham.

Membership
It comprises six associations:
 Association of Ductwork Contractors and Allied Services (ADCAS)
 Building Controls Industry Association (BCIA)
 British Flue and Chimney Manufacturers Association (BFCMA)
 British Refrigeration Association (BRA)
 Heating, Ventilating and Air Conditioning Manufacturers Association (HEVAC)
 Heat Pump Association (HPA)

Activities 
FETA works with government bodies, other associations and organisations.

In 2020, FETA warned facilities managers about the need to have risk assessments with respect to DSEAR (Dangerous Substances and Explosive Atmospheres Regulations).
In 2021, FETA was a founder member of an alliance of engineering services organisations, Actuate UK, launched on 10 February.

See also
 Fire Extinguishing Trades Association
 Institute of Refrigeration

References

External links
FETA Official Website
Baseboard Heater Thermostat

Trade associations based in the United Kingdom
Heating, ventilation, and air conditioning
Organisations based in Berkshire
Borough of Wokingham
Heat pumps
Environmental